Edwin B. "Ed." Weinberger is an American screenwriter and television producer.

Life and career
Born in 1938 and raised in Philadelphia, the only son of Jewish butcher Leon and his wife Helen Weinberger, Ed. Weinberger began his TV career after he dropped out of Columbia University, writing for such stand-up comedians as Dick Gregory, Richard Pryor, and Bill Cosby. His first job in television was writing for The Tonight Show Starring Johnny Carson. He also wrote for The Bob Hope Special, The Bill Cosby Show, and The Dean Martin Variety Hour.

Weinberger, along with James L. Brooks, David Davis, Allan Burns, and Stan Daniels, formed the core of MTM Enterprises. In 1977, they left for Paramount Pictures and started the John Charles Walters Company. Weinberger also played Mr. Walters in the logo. The series Taxi was created the following year. He also wrote and co-created The Cosby Show, which ran for eight years. Weinberger went on to create and executive produce several other sitcoms, including Amen, Mr. President, Dear John, Baby Talk, and Sparks. In 1985, he became president of television production company Carson Productions, replacing John J. McMahon.

Weinberger has won a Peabody Award, three Golden Globe Awards, and nine Emmy Awards. He has also received the Writers Guild of America Lifetime Achievement Award.

He has been married to TV actress Carlene Watkins since 1984. With his son, Jack, Weinberger wrote and produced the musical play Mary and Joseph, which had a national tour in 2007–08.

Weinberger explained in 2000 that he began using the abbreviation "Ed." when he was eight years old, admitting that "it's an affectation that's gotten out of hand."

In 2012, he sued two former business managers, claiming they had failed to obtain revenue for him from his work on Amen. His case was dismissed in 2013 by the Los Angeles Superior Court, but that decision was overturned in 2015 by the appellate court.

References

External links

1945 births
American male screenwriters
American television writers
Columbia University alumni
Jewish American writers
Living people
American male television writers
Primetime Emmy Award winners
Screenwriters from Pennsylvania
Showrunners
Television producers from Pennsylvania
Writers from Philadelphia
21st-century American Jews
Central High School (Philadelphia) alumni